James Moyes (1851–1927) was a Scottish writer, theologian, and controversialist.

Biography
Moyes was born in Edinburgh in 1851.  He was educated in Ireland, France, and Rome at the Venerable English College, Rome. Ordained into the priesthood in 1875, he was later appointed professor at St Bede's College, Manchester, England. He was appointed canon theologian of Salford Chapter, 1891, and of the Westminster Chapter, 1895. In 1896, he served on the Papal Commission in Rome on Anglican matters on which he was an authority. In 1903 he was chosen as sub-delegate Apostolic for the Cause of English Martyrs. He edited the Dublin Review until 1903, contributed a vast amount of controversial literature on theological subjects to The Tablet, and wrote Aspects of Anglicanism, 1906.

Moyes died at the Hospital of St John and St Elizabeth in London on 11 March 1927.

Works or publications

References

Sources

1851 births
1921 deaths
Clergy from Edinburgh
19th-century Scottish Roman Catholic priests
20th-century British Roman Catholic theologians
19th-century British Roman Catholic theologians
Contributors to the Catholic Encyclopedia